The Metropolitan City of Milan is a metropolitan city (not to be confused with the metropolitan area) in the Lombardy region, Italy. It is the second most populous metropolitan city in the nation after the Metropolitan City of Rome. Its capital is the city of Milan. It replaced the Province of Milan and includes the city of Milan and other 133 municipalities or communes (comuni). It was first created by the reform of local authorities (Law 142/1990) and then established by the Law 56/2014. It has been operative since 1 January 2015.

The Metropolitan City of Milan is headed by the Metropolitan Mayor (Sindaco metropolitano) and by the Metropolitan Council (Consiglio metropolitano). Since June 2016 Giuseppe Sala, as mayor of the capital city, has been the mayor of the Metropolitan City.

Government

Metropolitan Council

The new Metro municipalities, giving large urban areas the administrative powers of a province, are conceived for improving the performance of local administrations and to slash local spending by better coordinating the municipalities in providing basic services (including transport, school and social programs) and environment protection. In this policy framework, the Mayor of Milan is designated to exercise the functions of Metropolitan mayor, presiding over a Metropolitan Council. The Council consists of mayors and city councillors of each comune in the Metropolitan City elected from amongst themselves using partially open list proportional representation, with seats allocated using the D'Hondt method.  Metropolitan councillors are elected at-large for five-year terms; votes for metropolitan councillors are weighted by grouping comunes of a certain population range into nine groups so that votes of the mayors and city councillors of the more populous groups are worth than those of less populous groups.

The first Metropolitan Council of the City was elected on 28 September 2014. The current Metropolitan Council of the City (2021-2026) was elected on 19 December 2021:

The Metropolitan Council is seated at Palazzo Isimbardi, located in Milan.

List of Metropolitan Mayors of Milan

Administrative divisions

The ten most-populous municipalities within the Metropolitan City are:

Transport

Milan metropolitan area is one of southern Europe's key transport nodes and one of Italy's most important railway hubs. Its five major railway stations, among which the Milan Central station, are among Italy's busiest.

The Azienda Trasporti Milanesi (ATM) operates within the metropolitan area, managing a public transport network consisting of an underground rapid transit network and tram, trolley-bus and bus lines. Overall the network covers nearly  reaching 86 municipalities. Besides public transport, ATM manages the interchange parking lots and other transportation services including bike sharing and car sharing systems.

The recently opened M5 line is undergoing further expansion and the construction of the M4 line has been approved. The Milan suburban railway service comprises 10 lines and connects the metropolitan area with the city centre through the Milan Passerby underground railway. Commonly referred to as "Il Passante", it has a train running every 6 minutes (and in the city functions as a subway line with full transferability to the Milan Metro).

Milan has also taxi services operated by private companies and licensed by the City council of Milan. The city is also a key node for the national road network, being served by all the major highways of Northern Italy.

The Milan metropolitan area is served by three international airports. Linate Airport, which lies within the city limits and served over 9 million passengers in 2010, and Orio al Serio Airport ( from central Milan), are mainly used for domestic and short-haul international flights.

See also 
 Province of Milan
 Milan metropolitan area

References

Milan
.
Provinces of Lombardy
2015 establishments in Italy
Populated places established in 2015

ko:밀라노 광역시